Polonsky Island (Russian: Полонского; Japanese: 多楽島 Тараку-то) is an island in the Habomai Islands in the southern part of the Lesser Kuril Islands which administratively belongs to Yuzhno-Kurilsky District of Sakhalin Oblast, in Russia. However, the Habomai Islands, together with Iturup, Kunashir and Shikotan, are claimed by Japan. The island got its name from the Russian explorer and geographer .

Geography
Its waters are rich in fish, particularly some species of salmon, cod and crabs and it is part of the territory of the Kurils Nature Reserve.

Polonsky Island is separated from Shikotan by the Spanberg Strait, to the southeast are the Oskolki islets.

References

Islands of the Kuril Islands